Marcel van der Westen (born 1 August 1976 in Laren, North Holland) is a retired Dutch hurdler.

He reached his first international final at the 2007 European Indoor Championships in 60 metres hurdles, and won the silver medal behind compatriot Gregory Sedoc. In 2008 he became Amsterdam Sportsman of the year.

Van der Westen had previously competed at the 2005 World Championships and the 2006 European Championships, as well as numerous European Indoor (2002, 2005) and World Indoor Championships (2003, 2004, 2006), without ever reaching the final.

His personal best time over 110 m hurdles is 13.43 seconds, achieved in June 2005 in Leiria.

He currently lives in Weesp and works as a tax consultant.

Competition record

External links

1976 births
Living people
Dutch male hurdlers
Sportspeople from Laren, North Holland
Olympic athletes of the Netherlands
Athletes (track and field) at the 2008 Summer Olympics